Speculator is a 1985 video game published by OCO Software.

Gameplay
Speculator is a game in which stock market trading is simulated in which 1 minute of playing time represents 6 minutes of time within the game.

Reception
Johnny L. Wilson reviewed the game for Computer Gaming World, and stated that "Speculator compares favorably with any other investment simulation on the market to date. It is competitively priced for the basic game and should be an especially worthwhile investment with the addition of new data disks."

References

External links
Article in Financial World
Review in PC World
The Investor's Information Sourcebook
Article in Personal Computing

1985 video games